Ristumine peateega is a 1999 Estonian drama film directed by Arko Okk and based on the Jaan Tätte's play ''Ristumine peateega ehk muinasjutt kuldsest kalakesest'.

The film talks about a young couple (Laura and Roland) who after unsuccessful hitchhiking and due to bad weather, tries to find a shelter at a nearby country house. House owner Osvald thinks that their visiting is not a random one. Osvald behaves strangely and makes unique offering for the couple. Osvald wants to buy Roland's wife. The couple is confused and try to figure out the motives of this offering.

Awards:
 1999: Stockholm International Film Festival, FIPRESCI award for the best feature film in the category "Northern Lights"
 2000: Uruguay International Film Festival (Montevideo), Best Opera Prima
 2000: Hong Kong International Film Festival, participating

Cast
Andrus Vaarik as Osvald
Piret Kalda as Laura
Jaan Tätte	as Roland
Emil Urbel	as Goldfish
Andres Tarand as Voice of Goldfish

References

External links
 
 Ristumine peateega, entry in Estonian Film Database (EFIS)

1999 films
Estonian drama films
Estonian-language films